Josephine Teo Li Min (née Yong; ; born 1968) is a Singaporean politician who has been serving as Minister for Communications and Information, Minister-in-charge of the Cyber Security Agency and Smart Nation Initiative since 2021 and Second Minister for Home Affairs since 2017. A member of the governing People's Action Party (PAP), she has been the Member of Parliament (MP) representing the Kreta Ayer–Kim Seng division of Jalan Besar GRC since 2020. 

Prior to entering politics, Teo had worked at the Economic Development Board (EDB), Agency for Science, Technology and Research (A*STAR) and National Trades Union Congress (NTUC). 

She made her political debut in the 2006 general election as part of a five-member PAP team contesting in Bishan–Toa Payoh GRC and won by an uncontested walkover. She has also been serving as Chairwoman of the PAP Community Foundation.

Education
Teo attended Dunman High School and Raffles Junior College before graduating from the National University of Singapore with a Bachelor of Arts degree in 1990 and a Bachelor of Social Sciences with honours degree in 1991. 

During her studies in NUS, she was awarded several prizes, including the Rachel Meyer Book Prize, which is awarded to the best-performing female candidate in the Faculty of Arts and Social Sciences' final-year examinations. 

She subsequently went on to complete a Master of Science degree in economics at the London School of Economics in 1992 under the Economic Development Board–Glaxo Scholarship Programme.

Early career 
Teo worked at the Economic Development Board (EDB) from 1992 to 2002. She began her career in enterprise development before she was posted to Suzhou as part of the EDB team working on the China-Singapore Suzhou Industrial Park, where she was responsible for marketing resources. Upon her return to Singapore, she became the EDB's Head of Human Resources.

From 2002 to 2006, Teo was the Head of Human Resources at the Agency for Science, Technology and Research (A*STAR).

In November 2005, Teo also took on the role of Director of Human Resources at the Administration and Research Unit of the National Trades Union Congress (NTUC). After she was elected to Parliament in 2006, Teo took on additional roles within the NTUC and the labour movement. She served as the Executive Secretary of the Singapore Industrial Services Employees' Union (2006–2011). At the Administration and Research Unit, she served as the Alignment Director (Youth Development) and Alignment Director (Organisation Development) (2007–11), and as the Centric Director (Staff) (2008–2011). She also served as the NTUC's Assistant Secretary-General from 2007 to 2011.

From 2009 to 2011, Teo also served as the Chief Executive Officer of Business China, an organisation aimed at improving cultural and economic ties between Singapore and China.

Political career

Early political career 
Teo made her political debut in the 2006 general election when she contested in Bishan–Toa Payoh Group Representation Constituency (GRC) as part of a five-member People's Action Party team. The PAP team won by an uncontested walkover and Teo became a Member of Parliament representing the Toa Payoh East ward of Bishan–Toa Payoh GRC.

During her first term in Parliament, Teo served as the Chair of the Government Parliamentary Committee for Education, and as a member of the Government Parliamentary Committee for Defence and Foreign Affairs.

Following the 2011 general election, Teo was part of a five-member People's Action Party team for Bishan–Toa Payoh Group Representation Constituency (GRC) and won about 56% against the Singapore People's Party. On 18 May 2011, Teo was appointed Minister of State at the Ministry of Finance and Ministry of Transport. She was promoted to Senior Minister of State at the Ministries of Finance and Transport on 1 September 2013, and switched to representing the Bishan North ward of Bishan–Toa Payoh GRC. She relinquished her position as Senior Minister of State at the Ministry of Finance on 30 September 2015. 

Following the 2015 general election, Teo was part of a five-member People's Action Party team for Bishan–Toa Payoh Group Representation Constituency (GRC) and won about 73% higher than the previous election against the Singapore People's Party.

Career promotion 
On 1 May 2017, Teo was promoted to full Minister and appointed Minister in the Prime Minister's Office, Second Minister for Manpower, and Second Minister for Foreign Affairs. She also oversaw the National Population and Talent Division, a department in the Prime Minister's Office. On 11 September 2017, she relinquished her portfolio as Second Minister for Foreign Affairs and became Second Minister for Home Affairs. On 1 May 2018, Teo succeeded Lim Swee Say as Minister for Manpower, being the second female Cabinet minister to helm a ministry after Grace Fu. She also continued to hold the portfolio of Second Minister for Home Affairs.

2020 - 2022 
In the 2020 general election, Teo moved from Bishan–Toa Payoh Group Representation Constituency to Jalan Besar Group Representation Constituency to help with the party's renewal. The PAP team won against the Peoples Voice team with about 65% of the vote. Teo then became the Member of Parliament representing the Kreta Ayer-Kim Seng ward of Jalan Besar GRC.

Teo was the PAP Community Foundation executive committee for 12 years as a member and the chairwoman from 2016 to 2020 and in October 2020 she was appointed as deputy chairwoman of the PCF management council.

Following a Cabinet reshuffle in May 2021, Teo succeeded S. Iswaran as Minister for Communication and Information while continuing to serve as Second Minister for Home Affairs. In addition, she was appointed Minister-in-charge of the Cyber Security Agency and Minister-in-charge of the Smart Nation Initiative. 

In June 2022, Teo was announced the new PAP Community Foundation (PCF) management council chairman, taking over from Minister of Finance Lawrence Wong, who become Deputy Prime Minister.

Political positions

Family planning 
In a media interview in October 2016, Teo responded to questions of whether Singaporeans were getting their HDB flats early enough in order to start a family, stating that one "does not need much space to have sex". Teo further added that "in France, in the U.K., in Nordic countries, man meets woman [and] they can make a baby already. They love each other." Teo's words drew flak from on social media, with netizens criticising her for lacking empathy towards couples and being insensitive towards couples' practical considerations such as being able to secure a HDB flat before starting a family, as well as accusing her of promoting premarital sex in conservative Singapore.

Cost of living 
In May 2017, Teo commented on her Facebook page about the high cost of milk powder in Singapore, saying that "milk is milk, however fancy the marketing". She further claimed that she would buy whichever brand of milk powder approved for sale by the Agri-Food and Veterinary Authority that was cheapest for her own children.

On 26 October 2018, during a conference held by the Institute of Policy Studies, Teo commented that implementing a minimum wage in Singapore may instead lead to higher unemployment and that Singapore's income inequality gap is "a problem of success" that is "difficult to overcome".

Personal life 
Teo is married Teo Eng Cheong, who is the Chief Executive Officer of Sino-Singapore Tianjin Eco-City and Investment Development Co (SSTEC) and former Chief Executive Officer of Surbana Jurong. They have two daughters and a son.

References

External links

 Josephine Teo on Prime Minister's Office
 Josephine Teo on Parliament of Singapore

 

Members of the Parliament of Singapore
People's Action Party politicians
Singaporean women in politics
National University of Singapore alumni
Raffles Junior College alumni
Singaporean people of Hakka descent
Singaporean Christians
1968 births
Living people
Singaporean trade unionists
Dunman High School alumni
Women government ministers of Singapore
Ministers for Manpower of Singapore
Members of the Cabinet of Singapore